Hope was launched at Peterhead in 1802. She was a whaler in the British northern whale fishery for her entire career. She was lost on 3 July 1830 in the Davis Strait. Her crew were rescued.

Career
The Peterhead Greenland whale fishery began in 1788 with a voyage by a relatively small vessel, Robert, of 169 tons (bm). In 1798 Alexander Geary became master of Robert, and under his command her success improved markedly: she brought in four whales that yielded more than 70 tons of whale oil. However, she was a small vessel, and ill-suited to the business. In 1801 her owners sold her. The newly-built Hope, with Geary in command, replaced Robert. Hope was larger, at 240 tons (bm), and better equipped for Arctic work. In her first whaling season, Hope took 11 whales and brought home more than 117 tons of blubber. 

At about this time Geary, with others, formed Peterhead's first whaling company. They purchased a granary at Keith Inch and converted it into a boil house and stores.

The data below is from the Scottish Arctic Whaling Database. 

Eighteen-fourteen was the most successful year for Peterhead whalers. The seven Peterhead whalers killed a total of 163 whales to bring in a total of 192 tuns of whale oil; this gives an average of 198½ tuns per whale. Hope was the least successful of the seven whalers.  

In 1821 she was registered at Aberdeen with Mackie, master, and John Hutchinson, owner.

Fate
Hope was lost on 3 July 1830. She was one of the many whalers lost in 1830. She was Peterhead's longest-serving whaler. 
 
Eighteen-thirty was the worst year for ship losses in the Arctic since 1819, when whalers first crossed the straits. Eighteen whalers (or 19), out of 91 vessels were lost, for a total tonnage of 5,614 tons (bm). The second highest loss had occurred in 1823 when 13 vessels totaling 4,409 tons (bm), were lost.

Citations and references
Citations

References
 
 

1802 ships
Ships built in Scotland
Whaling ships
Maritime incidents in July 1830